Edward "Ned" Leeds is a fictional character appearing in American comic books published by Marvel Comics. A supporting character in stories featuring the superhero Spider-Man, he has been a reporter for the Daily Bugle, and the abusive husband of Betty Brant. Leeds is the first character to take on the Hobgoblin mantle as a supervillain; ten years following his assassination, he is retroactively established to have been willingly brainwashed to serve as a stand-in for Roderick Kingsley and his brother Daniel Kingsley, the true first Hobgoblins and masterminds, and killed before he could give them up to the authorities for a lesser sentence, and as such the third Hobgoblin: prior to this, from 1987 to 1997, Ned was originally depicted as having been the true identity of the first Hobgoblin. The character was revived in a 2018–2021 storyline where he was revealed to have been a willing Hobgoblin, faking his death to seek revenge on the Foreigner for having attempted to kill him, and using the brainwashing story to convince Betty to take him back and impregnate her, with the character confirmed to have been the first (willing, non-brainwashed) Hobgoblin in a 2022 storyline.

Jacob Batalon portrays Ned Leeds in the Marvel Cinematic Universe (MCU), appearing in Spider-Man: Homecoming (2017), Avengers: Infinity War (2018), Avengers: Endgame and Spider-Man: Far From Home (both 2019), and The Daily Bugle and Spider-Man: No Way Home (both 2021).

Publication history
Created by Stan Lee and Steve Ditko, Ned Leeds made his first appearance in The Amazing Spider-Man #18 (November 1964). His character is killed off in the one-shot Spider-Man vs. Wolverine (February 1987), written by then Spider-Man editor Jim Owsley. Tom DeFalco, Ron Frenz, and Peter David (of the creative teams on the ongoing Spider-Man books) found this objectionable, saying that Owsley gave them no warning that he was going to kill Leeds, then a regular cast member in the Spider-Man books. Frenz remarked:

Fictional character biography

Ned Leeds was a reporter for the Daily Bugle. He and Peter Parker compete for the affections of Daily Bugle secretary Betty Brant, but Parker drops out of the running due to realizing that Brant will not be able to accept Spider-Man's double identity. He would win outright when Betty went into stress induced shock after J. Jonah Jameson was attacked at the Daily Bugle by the Scorpion. Leeds and Brant are married shortly after. However, the couple's marriage is often strained.

When Spider-Man battles the Hobgoblin, Ned follows the Hobgoblin to a hideout. When the Hobgoblin realizes Ned is present, Ned is captured and brainwashed as a scapegoat in case of being unmasked. Wanting to find out about the Kingpin, Ned approaches Richard Fisk. Discovering that Richard hates the Kingpin, Leeds helps create Richard's secret identity as the Rose. The Hobgoblin manipulates Ned to remove the Kingpin from the scene. Ned's regular brainwashing causes his marriage with Betty and professional relationships to fall apart. Increasingly mentally unstable, Ned drives Betty to seek solace in Flash Thompson. While Flash makes statements about the Hobgoblin and events are staged so Flash is revealed as the enigmatic villain, Ned and Richard reach a disagreement and Ned decides to turn in the Rose to the Kingpin, and thus Ned is no longer needed as Hobgoblin. After Flash is cleared of being framed, the New York underworld empire is known that Ned is actually Hobgoblin and that he would soon be traveling to Berlin. Ned and Peter go on an assignment in Berlin, and Leeds is murdered by the Foreigner at Jason Macendale's request as a replacement Hobgoblin. The Kingpin presents photos of Ned in the Hobgoblin costume (which was obtained via the Foreigner) to Spider-Man in an attempt to get Spider-Man to go after the Foreigner.
Peter reflected on Ned's death years later, believing Ned must have been framed as Hobgoblin as the Foreigner's non-superhuman operatives would never have been able to defeat the real Hobgoblin. Around this time, the original Hobgoblin returns to eliminate Macendale, revealing the deception of Leeds being a stand-in. Spider-Man and Betty subsequently provoked Roderick Kingsley into confessing to Ned's framing on tape.

During the "Dead No More: The Clone Conspiracy" storyline, a clone of Ned Leeds is created by Ben Reilly (posing as Jackal) and is seen in New U Technologies' facility Haven. The clone is revealed to have survived the end of the event and disguised himself as a hobo to continue watching over Betty. It is shown that Betty still cares for Ned. While still unaware of his survival, Ned feels that he is proud of Betty's accomplishments. The clone later dies during a conflict between Spider-Man, Rhino, Taskmaster and Black Ant and tries to warn Spider-Man of something after Betty in the near future, revealed to be the real Ned Leeds, apparently revived.

By the time Spider-Man meets Kindred in person during the "Last Remains" arc, he finds that Kindred had dug up the bodies of Ned Leeds, Ben Parker, George Stacy, Gwen Stacy, Jean DeWolff, and Marla Jameson and sat them around a dinner table.

Powers and abilities
Ned Leeds had a Bachelor of Arts degree in Journalism, and was a master of deductive reasoning and investigation. He was a normal man who engaged in regular exercise, which increased to more intensive levels after assuming the Hobgoblin role. While brainwashed, Ned wore the Hobgoblin's uniform and used the glider and equipment which included Jack O'Lantern bombs, razor bats and electrical shock gloves. However, he had no healing factor or superhuman strength.

Other versions

Ultimate Marvel
The Ultimate Marvel version of Ned Leeds is a reporter for the Daily Bugle and an alcoholic with an antagonistic relationship with Betty Brant.

Spider-Man Loves Mary Jane
Ned Leeds appears in the dramatic comic book Spider-Man Loves Mary Jane. In this continuity, the characters are high school students, and Ned is Mary Jane's boyfriend, who breaks up with her to reunite with his ex-girlfriend Betty Brant.

In other media

Television
 Ned Leeds appears in Spider-Man, voiced by Bob Bergen. This version is a reporter for the Daily Bugle.
 Additionally, Leeds as the Hobgoblin serves as partial inspiration for the series version of the character, Jason Phillips, voiced by Mark Hamill.
 A character based on Ned Leeds, named Ned Lee, appears in The Spectacular Spider-Man, voiced by Andrew Kishino. This version is a Korean-American reporter for the Daily Bugle who is convinced that he can uncover Spider-Man's secret identity and that the Green Goblin is connected. He also displays an attraction to his co-worker Betty Brant. He primarily makes minor appearances, investigating leads on Spider-Man's identity throughout the series, most notably determining it cannot be Peter Parker after Venom tried unsuccessfully to out the hero's identity.

Film

A variation of Ned Leeds appears in films set in the Marvel Cinematic Universe (MCU), portrayed by Jacob Batalon. This version is Filipino-American.
 Leeds is introduced in Spider-Man: Homecoming (2017), as Peter Parker's best friend who is initially unaware of his friend's secret identity before shortly finding out and supporting him as Spider-Man.  
 Leeds makes a cameo appearance in Avengers: Infinity War (2018), aiding Parker by distracting their classmates so the latter can leave and help the Avengers.
 Leeds makes a cameo appearance In Avengers: Endgame, sharing an emotional reunion with Parker following their return from the Blip.
 In Spider-Man: Far From Home (2019), Leeds becomes romantically involved with classmate Betty Brant despite his initial claims of being a single bachelor throughout a school field trip to Europe while supporting Parker's feelings for MJ. Following the end of the trip however, Leeds and Brant mutually break up and remain friends.
 In Spider-Man: No Way Home (2021), Leeds, Parker and MJ have trouble applying to colleges after Parker's identity as Spider-Man is publicly revealed by Mysterio. Parker seeks help from Doctor Strange for help in making everyone forget. However, Strange's spell backfires and pulls in supervillains who fought Spider-Man from across the multiverse. Strange tasks Parker, Leeds, and MJ with capturing the villains, but Parker traps Strange in the Mirror Dimension in an attempt to reform the villains. While using Strange's Sling Ring to find Parker, Leeds and MJ encounter two alternate universe versions of Parker that they nickname "Peter-Two" and "Peter-Three". Once the three Spider-Men defeat and cure the villains, Strange returns the displaced individuals to their respective home universes before Parker asks him to erase all memory of the latter from everyone in their universe, resulting in Leeds forgetting his friendship with Parker and Spider-Man's secret identity.

Video games
 The Ned Leeds incarnation of the Hobgoblin appears in Spider-Man and Captain America in Doctor Doom's Revenge.
 The Ned Leeds incarnation of the Hobgoblin appears as a boss in The Amazing Spider-Man.
 The Ned Leeds incarnation of the Hobgoblin appears in Spider-Man: The Video Game, voiced by David Hadinger.
 The Ned Leeds incarnation of the Hobgoblin appears as a boss in The Amazing Spider-Man 2.
 The Ned Leeds incarnation of the Hobgoblin appears as a playable character in Lego Marvel Super Heroes 2.

Miscellaneous
The Ned Leeds incarnation of the Hobgoblin appears ine The Amazing Adventures of Spider-Man, voiced by Pat Fraley. This version is a member of Doctor Octopus' Sinister Syndicate.

Notes

References

External links
 Ned Leed's Profile at Spiderfan.org
 Squandered Legacy

Comics characters introduced in 1964
Fictional characters from New York City
Fictional reporters
Spider-Man characters
Characters created by Stan Lee
Characters created by Steve Ditko
Fictional domestic abusers
Internet memes
Hobgoblin (comics)